Vriesea minor is a plant species in the genus Vriesea. This species is native to Brazil.

References

minor
Flora of Brazil